Zanthoxylum panamense is a species of plant in the family Rutaceae. It is found in Costa Rica, Honduras, and Panama.

References

panamense
Endangered plants
Taxonomy articles created by Polbot